Rotbach may refer to:

Rotbach (Rhine), a river of North Rhine-Westphalia, Germany, tributary of the Rhine
Rotbach (Erft), a river of North Rhine-Westphalia, Germany, tributary of the Erft
Rotbach (Biberach an der Riss), a river of Baden-Württemberg, Germany, tributary of the Riss
Rotbach (Dreisam), a river of Baden-Württemberg, Germany, tributary of the Dreisam